Skocpol is a surname. Notable people with the surname include:

 Theda Skocpol (born 1947), American sociologist and political scientist
 William Skocpol (born 1946), American physicist